Central Community College is a two-year Nebraska public college with three campuses, in Columbus, Grand Island, and Hastings. In addition the college has learning centers in Holdrege, Kearney, and Lexington. Under the terms of a 1971 Nebraska state law, Central is one of six regional community colleges in the state, serving a group of 25 counties and funded by property taxes within those counties in addition to state aid, tuition and fees, and grants.

History

Central Community College at Hastings (opened 1966 as Central Nebraska Technical College, later known as Central Technical College) occupies part of the site of the Naval Ammunition Depot and uses some of its former buildings. It was the first multi-county vocational-technical college in Nebraska.

Central Community College at Columbus (opened 1969), near the city limits in an unincorporated area, was originally Platte Junior College, then Platte Technical College, and was the first county-supported community college in Nebraska.

Central Community College at Grand Island opened in 1976; the college's central administration had been established in Grand Island in 1974.

The Kearney Center originated in 1958 as a practical nursing education program sponsored by Kearney Public Schools.

The Lexington Center was established in 1977 to serve four counties.

The Holdrege Center opened in 1995 to improve services to the southwest portion of Central Community College's service area.

Central Community College was approved as an Academic Quality Improvement Project (AQIP) college in 2002.

Academic programs
Central Community College offers a variety of programs in general education, academic transfer subjects, agriculture, automotive (at Hastings only), business, construction, electronics and information technology, health care, human and social services, manufacturing and fabrication, and media arts and graphic arts. Central Community College at Columbus is a National Alternative Fuels Training Consortium training center. Like all Nebraska community colleges, Central offers the Navy Tech Prep program in Electronics in association with the US Navy. Of the programs offered at only some Nebraska community colleges, Central offers the Health Information Management Systems, Paralegal, Fire Training, and Respiratory Care Technology programs. It has a library collection sharing program with Metropolitan Community College. All the community colleges offer distance learning; Central also offers individualized learning programs that enable students to enroll or leave at any time.

Fine Arts
Central Community College at Columbus offers courses in art, music, and theatre. Concerts, plays, and two art shows are staged throughout the year in the Fine Arts Theater.

Athletics
Central Community College at Columbus Raiders teams compete in men's and women's basketball, men's golf,  women's softball, men's and women's 
soccer and women's volleyball.

References

Sources

External links
 Official website

Educational institutions established in 1966
Two-year colleges in the United States
Community colleges in Nebraska
Buildings and structures in Adams County, Nebraska
Buildings and structures in Buffalo County, Nebraska
Education in Dawson County, Nebraska
Education in Hall County, Nebraska
Education in Phelps County, Nebraska
Education in Platte County, Nebraska
Education in Adams County, Nebraska
Education in Buffalo County, Nebraska
1966 establishments in Nebraska
NJCAA athletics